Nº3 is the third studio album by alternative rock band Dot Hacker. The album was released on January 20, 2017 on ORG Music label.
The album cover art was created by Josh Klinghoffer although it was not originally designed for this purpose.

Track listing

Personnel 
Dot Hacker
 Josh Klinghoffer – lead vocals, guitar, keyboards, synthesizers
 Clint Walsh – guitar, backing vocals, synthesizers
 Jonathan Hischke – bass guitar
 Eric Gardner – drums

References 

2017 albums
Dot Hacker albums